The Togutil people (also known as Inner Tobelo, a term referring to the isolated people of Halmahera who live in the woods and "can sleep standing up under a leaf during rain") are an indigenous group with a semi-nomadic lifestyle living in the jungles of Totodoku, Tukur-Tukur, Lolobata, Kobekulo and Buli, North Maluku in the Aketajawe-Lolobata National Park, North Halmahera Regency, North Maluku, Indonesia.

The external ethnonym Togutil is equivalent to the native designations o fongana ma nyawa and o hongana ma nyawa (literally "the forest people"). Their lifestyle is very much dependent on the surroundings of the jungle. Sago is a staple food.

Their settlements are usually in groups of community along river banks. There are about 42 households of Togutil communities that settled along the Dodaga river, while about 500  lived along the Akelamo river. Their houses are made of wood and bamboo with Pelem leaves (a type of Livistona) as roofing. Generally their houses do not have walls or wooden flooring.

The Togutils are categorized as separate group of people living in the interiors of north and central Halmahera. The Togutil people use the same language as the Tobelo people that live in the coastal area. Their communities are often categorized as a group of outcasts living in the jungles compared to the Tobelo living in the coastal area. Their physical appearance, especially their facial features and skin tone have a stronger resemblance to the Malay people than of the Tobelo.

According to legend, they are actually coastal dwellers who moved to the jungles in order to avoid taxes. In 1915 during rule of the Dutch East Indies, there was an effort to settle them in the countryside of Kusuri and Tobelamo. But because they refused to pay taxes, they returned to the jungles and the settlement effort became a failure.

Ethnos360 (formally New Tribes Mission) evangelical Christian missionaries planted a church and established a village at Tanjung Lili in eastern North Maluku in 1982. Proselytisation has been largely successful with the mission's converted Togutil leaders continuing the work of the missionary organisation by spreading the Gospel in more remote interior jungle areas. "Today almost all of the people who formerly lived along the Waisango, Lili, and Afu Rivers have converted to Christianity. Virtually all beliefs and practices connected with their previous indigenous cosmology, such as ancestor worship, have been discarded as incompatible with Christianity. Members of the community strongly discourage any attempt to reinitiate these practices, which are now considered to be misguided beliefs that they followed while under the influence of Satan."

Lifestyle
The Togutil have a very laid back lifestyle. Some of them still wear loinclothes, although most of them have adopted modern clothing. Apart from farming they lived on sago, pigs, and fish from the rivers. They also harvest Megapode eggs, resins, and antler horns to be sold to people from the coastal area. Bananas, cassava, sweet potatoes, papayas and sugar cane are common crops that can be found in their gardens. However, because of their semi-nomadic lifestyle, it is presumed that the farms are not cultivated intensively. Therefore, as it is common in areas where there are primitive tribes, jungles in this region do not show any significant disruption.

References

Ethnic groups in Indonesia
Moluccan people